Lowcountry Regional Airport  is a public use airport located two nautical miles (4 km) northeast of the central business district of Walterboro, a city in Colleton County, South Carolina, United States. It is owned by the city and county. This airport is included in the National Plan of Integrated Airport Systems for 2011–2015, which categorized it as a general aviation facility. It does not have scheduled commercial airline service.

History 
The airport was dedicated June 15, 1933 as the C.C. Anderson Landing Field. In 1942 the United States Army Air Forces indicated a need for the airfield as a training airfield and control was turned over to the USAAF in February 1942. An immediate construction program began to turn the civil airport into a military airfield. Construction involved runways and airplane hangars, with three concrete runways, several taxiways and a large parking apron and a control tower. Several large hangars were also constructed. Buildings were ultimately utilitarian and quickly assembled. Most base buildings, not meant for long-term use, were constructed of temporary or semi-permanent materials. Although some hangars had steel frames and the occasional brick or tile brick building could be seen, most support buildings sat on concrete foundations but were of frame construction clad in little more than plywood and tarpaper. Walterboro Army Airfield was assigned to Third Air Force III Air Support Command, and activated on August 15, 1942. The 305th Air Base Group was the station host unit.

Initially Walterboro AAF was used primarily for training of B-25 Mitchell medium bomber pilots and aircrews, acting a sub-base of Columbia Army Airfield for follow-on training prior to the units being deployed to overseas combat theaters. Units assigned to the airfield during World War II were:
 310th Bombardment Group (Medium), 11 August – 18 September 1942
 321st Bombardment Group (Medium), September 1942 – 18 December 1942
 340th Bombardment Group (Medium), 30 November 1942 – 30 January 1943
 345th Bombardment Group (Medium), 6 March – 16 April 1943
 405th Fighter-Bomber Group, 14 September 1943 – 14 September 1944, (A-24 Dauntless A-25 Shrike)

Walterboro AAF also hosted the largest camouflage school in the United States, as well as a 250-person Prisoner of War Camp. In 1944 it was reassigned to First Air Force and became an advanced combat training base for individual fighters, primarily the black trainees graduating from Tuskegee Army Air Field in Tuskegee, Alabama. Over 500 of the famed Tuskegee Airmen trained at Walterboro Army Air Field between April 1944 and October 1945 including individuals training as replacement pilots for the 332nd Fighter Squadron and the entire 447th Bombardment Group. A memorial has been erected at the site commemorating their service.

The base closed on October 31, 1945, and returned to its origins as a local airfield.

Facilities and aircraft 

For the 12-month period ending July 6, 2018, the airport had 12,620 aircraft operations, an average of 35 per day: 86% general aviation, 9% air taxi, and 5% military. At that time there were 37 aircraft based at this airport: 86% single-engine and 14% multi-engine.

See also 

 South Carolina World War II Army Airfields
 List of airports in South Carolina

References 

 
 Manning, Thomas A. (2005), History of Air Education and Training Command, 1942–2002. Office of History and Research, Headquarters, AETC, Randolph AFB, Texas

External links
 Aerial image as of January 1994 from USGS The National Map
 

1943 establishments in South Carolina
Airports in South Carolina
Buildings and structures in Colleton County, South Carolina
Transportation in Colleton County, South Carolina
Airports established in 1943
Airfields of the United States Army Air Forces in South Carolina